Arthur Wright (1870 – 19 December 1932) was an Australian writer best known for his novels set against a background of the sporting world, particularly horseracing, which meant he was often compared during his lifetime to Nat Gould. In his lifetime he was called "Australia's most prolific novelist".

Biography
Wright was born in the small town of Green Swamp near Bathurst. His family lived in Bathurst, then Cow Flat before moving to Sydney.

Wright was educated at Paddington Public School, worked for a sewing machine firm, then went bush for a few years, doing various odd jobs in places like the mines, shearing sheds and railways. He returned to Sydney and worked for the Water and Sewerage Board for eight years.

While at the Water Board, Wright began to write in his spare time, and his short stories started appearing in magazines such as The Bulletin.

His first novel, Keane of Kalgoorlie was a big success, launching his career as a novelist. He wrote mainly for the Bookstall series of the NSW Bookstall Company, which published Australian paperback novels aimed at the mass market and available for around one shilling a book. By 1914 it was estimated Wright had sold 60,000 copies of his books, but he continued to work as a wharfinger in the Sydney suburb of Manly up until his death. He would work six days a week on the wharf for the Port Jackson and Manly Steamship Company, and write his novels on Sundays.

Towards the end of his life Wright began to publish his work in London. His most popular novels were Keane of Kalgoorlie, Gambler's Gold and Rogue's Luck.

Death
Wright died in a private hospital in Manly. He was survived by his wife Elizabeth and seven children. He remained as an employee of the Port Jackson Ferry Company at the time of his death, and flags were flown at half mast on Manly ferry as a sign of respect.

Filmmaking
Several of Wright's novels were filmed and he also wrote screenplays. In 1931 he wrote a piece on the Australian film industry:
To those who seek a market overseas for their product, I would say this: Apart from the Great War, it is sport which has placed Australia on the map. Australia is noted for its cricketers, its footballers, scullers, swimmers, and athletes generally, to say nothing of its horses and horsemen. Our native country is world-famous from a sporting viewpoint; then give the world pictures of the things in which we excel: show them our racecourses, our playing fields, our surfing beaches, and our racing craft on Sydney Harbour. Then the world will sit up and take notice.

Critical reception
Wright's work was not highly regarded critically at the time. This contemporary review of Gambler's Gold appeared in the West Australian: 
Judging from this latest publication by the author of 'Keane of Kalgoorlie', imaginative literature in Australia has got down to the deadest low water of spring-tide ebbs. The story is full of murders, horse-stealings, and turf frauds, drunks and welshers. This fact, however, does not invalidate the right to claim for the compilation Australian authenticity – all these things can be substantiated by police court reports in evening newspapers. The trouble is that there is no coherency in this wild and woolly farrago of delinquencies and stupidities. To outline the "plot" is practically impossible. The story drifts from one absurdity to another. There seems to be no possibility of rational connection between the events: there is certainly no emotional sentiment, no principle, no characterisation, no redeeming feature whatever in the crude production.
However another contemporary writer declared that:
Arthur Wright's sporting yarns have a real Australian ring about them. The villainies of the turf underworld are laid bare by his pen, and he never fails to secure a triumph for straight racing in the end. What this author doesn't know about the inner workings of the racing world is not worth learning. Through all his books the romance of love commands adequate attention but he doesn't dawdle over the subject. There is a directness in all his writings that permits no stumbling. His books lend themselves to dramatisation and to the biograph.
Another profile said "Wright cherishes no illusions about his work. He knows it is not Art. He seeks to climb no 'Parnassus of Pure Prose; nor does he wish to be buried in Westminster Abbey. He writes for the simple honest reason that he wants to make money."

According to one obituary "Wright never claimed for his novels that they were for highbrows but he believed that they were capable of pleasing the multitude that loves sporting and detective fiction. In this belief he was justified."

Writings

Short stories
Dwyer's Sweep (1904) – in The Bulletin vol. 25 no. 1289 27 October 1904 periodical issue pg. v 
Old Bundaroo (1904) – in Steele Rudd's Magazine 7 May 1904 periodical issue pg. 23 
A New Years Eve (1904) – in The Bulletin vol. 25 no. 1298 29 December 1904 periodical issue pg. 35 
The Shearing of Skinng (1905) – in Steele Rudd's Magazine July 1905 periodical issue pg. 651-653 
A Night on the Track (1905) – in Steele Rudd's Magazine October 1905 periodical issue pg. 838-840 
Foster's Joke (1905) – in Steele Rudd's Magazine October 1905 periodical issue pg. 897-900 
The Undoing of Johnson (1905) – in Steele Rudd's Magazine vol. 2 no. 11 December 1905 periodical issue pg. 1086–1089 
Keane of Kalgoorlie (1906)
A Whirlwind (1906) – in The Bulletin vol. 27 no. 1351 4 January 1906 periodical issue pg. 40 
A Close Call (1906) – in The Australian Town and Country Journal vol. 73 no. 1918 7 November 1906
In Memoriam (1906) – in The Bulletin vol. 27 no. 1366 19 April 1906 periodical issue pg. 39
Paddy's Market Desperado (1906) – in The Bulletin vol. 27 no. 1380 26 July 1906 
Graham's Old Man (1906) – in The Bulletin (Xmas edition) vol. 27 no. 1400 13 December 1906
A Penny Dreadful Victim (1907)
The Stiffening of Quandong – in The Australian Town and Country Journal vol. 75 no. 1975 11 December 1907 
A Christmas Eve (1908) – in  The Bulletin (Xmas edition) vol. 29 no. 1504 10 December 1908
The Interference of Dinan (1909) – in The Bulletin vol. 30 no. 1521 8 April 1909 
Black Talbot the Bushranger (1910)
Her Desperate Plunge (1911)
The Cardsharper (1918)
A Call from the Country (1922)

Novels
Keane of Kalgoorlie (1907)
A Rogue's Luck (1910)
Gambler's Gold (1911)
Rung In (1912)
In the Last Stride (1914)
 A Sport from Hollowlog Flat (1915) – later adapted into a play
The Hate of a Hun (1916)
Under a Cloud (1916)
Over the Odds (1918)
The Breed Holds Good (1918)
When Nuggets Glistened (1919)
The Outlaw's Daughter (1919)
A Game of Chance (1919)
A Rough Passage (1920)
Fettered by Fate (1921)
The Boss o'Yedden (1922)
A Colt from the Country (1922)
The Boy from Bullarah (1925)
The Squatter's Secret (1927)
A Good Recovery (1928)
Gaming for Gold (1929)
A Crooked Game (1930)

Screenplay
The Loyal Rebel (1915)

References

External links
Arthur Wright at National Film and Sound Archive
Arthur Wright at Trove, National Library of Australia

Selected complete short stories
A Penny Dreadful Victim (1907)
Black Talbot the Bushranger (1910)
Her Desperate Plunge (1911)
The Loyal Rebel (1915)
The Cardsharper (1918)
The Worst Woman in Wolloomooloo (1922)
Winning Through (1924) – Dec 20, Dec 27, 3 Jan, 10 Jan, 17 Jan, 24 Jan, 31 Jan, 7 Feb, 14 Feb, 21 Feb, 28 Feb, 7 March, 14 March, 21 March, 28 March, 4 April, 11 April, 18 April, 25 April, 2 May, 9 May
The White Terror (1928) – 24 July, 31 July, 7 August, 14 August, 21 August, 28 August, 4 Sept, 11 Sept, 18 Sept, 25 Sept, 2 Oct, 9 Oct, 16 Oct, 23 Oct, 30 Oct, 6 Nov, 13 Nov, 20 Nov, 27 Nov, 4 Dec, 11 Dec, 18 Dec 
When Equine Heroes Found A Watery Grave: A Cyclone of The 'Seventies

1932 deaths
1870 births
20th-century Australian writers